The Monks' 1964–1965 demos were professional studio recordings that preceded the album Black Monk Time.  These have been released 3 times, all also including two tracks from a single by The Five Torquays (the band's name before transforming themselves into the Monks).

Five Upstart Americans (Omplatten, 1999)

Five Upstart Americans is the first release of earlier demo versions of songs from Black Monk Time, plus other previously unheard songs. It was released on CD in 1999 by Omplatten, Ltd.

Track listing 
All tracks by The Monks

Bonus Tracks
A single by The 5 Torquays, an early incarnation of the Monks

Personnel 
Gary Burger – Liner Notes
Jeff Gibson – Executive Producer
Johan Kugelberg – Executive Producer
Frank Longo – Art Direction

Demo Tapes 1965 (Play Loud! Productions, 2007)

Demo Tapes 1965 is the second release of the demos and was issued in Europe with a different track order, as well as an additional bonus track from a tribute album in 2007.

Track listing
All songs written by Burger/Clark/Shaw/Day/Johnston

Bonus Tracks

The Early Years 1964–1965 (Light in the Attic Records, 2009)

Personnel
Gary Burger – guitar, vocals
Larry Clark – organ
Roger Johnston – drums
Eddie Shaw – bass
Dave Day – banjo

References

External links 
 

 
Monks Demos